Rabacfosadine, sold under the brand name Tanovea-CA1, is a guanine nucleotide analog used for the treatment of lymphoma in dogs. The drug was granted conditional approval by the U.S. Food and Drug Administration under application number 141-475 for use in treating canine lymphoma in December 2016 pending a full demonstration of effectiveness, and became the first drug to receive full approval for the treatment of canine lymphoma in July 2021.

Originally developed by Gilead Sciences as GS-9219, rabacfosadine is no longer being pursued for use in the treatment of lymphoma in humans.

The active form of rabacfosadine is a chain-terminating inhibitor of the major deoxyribonucleic acid (DNA) polymerases. In vitro studies have demonstrated that rabacfosadine inhibits DNA synthesis, resulting in S phase arrest and induction of apoptosis. It also inhibits the proliferation of lymphocytes in dogs with naturally occurring lymphoma.

Veterinary uses 
In July 2021, the U.S. Food and Drug Administration (FDA) approved Tanovea to treat lymphoma in dogs. Lymphoma, also called lymphosarcoma, is a type of cancer that can affect many species, including dogs. Tanovea is the first conditionally approved new animal drug for dogs to achieve the FDA's full approval.

Adverse effects 
Common side effects of rabacfosadine are decreased white blood cell count, diarrhea, vomiting, decreased appetite or loss of appetite, weight loss, decreased activity level, and skin problems. Other side effects may occur.

References

External links 
 

Veterinary drugs
Purines
Cyclopropanes
Organophosphates